Je t'aime moi non plus (English title: I Love You, I Don't) is a 1976 feature film written, directed, and scored by Serge Gainsbourg, starring Jane Birkin, Hugues Quester and Joe Dallesandro, and featuring a cameo by Gérard Depardieu.

Plot 
A frail and love-starved young woman, Johnny (Jane Birkin), works in a truckstop café in the middle of nowhere. One day two gay truckers enter, manly and worldwise Krassky (Joe Dallesandro) and his younger lover Padovan (Hugues Quester). Padovan is young and handsome, but immature and rather a handful.

Krassky, tired of taking care of Padovan, who keeps getting into trouble, discovers in himself an attraction for this boyish girl. She in turn falls head over heels for him. They start a relationship; though Krassky hesitates before the meager feminine graces of curveless Johnny, he ends up being charmed by her naïve and unconditional love.

She is willing to accept anything out of love for him, including anal sex. Although inexperienced at this, so that her screams of pain cause them to be thrown out of several motels. In the end, the back of Krassky's dirty garbage truck will be the theatre of their union.

Furiously jealous, Padovan tries to kill Johnny by suffocating her. Krassky intervenes and saves Johnny, but does it so casually that Johnny gets enraged and insults him. Krassky then returns to his first love and leaves with him, abandoning Johnny to her café, brokenhearted and lonely once again.

Cast
 Jane Birkin as Johnny
 Joe Dallesandro as Krassky
 Hugues Quester as Padovan
 Reinhard Kolldehoff as Boris 
 Gérard Depardieu as man on horse
 Jimmy Davis as Moïse 
 Maïté Nahyr as prostitute
 Liliane Rovère as motel client
 Michel Blanc as worker
 Claudia Butenuth as customer

Background and production 
Je t'aime moi non plus was the first film directed by Gainsbourg. It took its title from his song "Je t'aime... moi non plus" and stars Jane Birkin, his wife, who performed the song with him in a scandal-provoking 1969 release. Dallesandro, cast as Krassky, was known for his muscular build. Depardieu appears briefly as a gay local.

The film's themes of sexual freedom and the ultimate unachievability of all-encompassing love are typical of the 1970s and of Gainsbourg's work.

Release and reception 
Released in France on March 10, 1976, the film was panned in reviews as immoral and did poorly, but was defended by French cinephiles including François Truffaut. It was released on video by the independent label Western Connection in 1994, and in the mid-2000s it was released on DVD. A restored version was released in the United States in 2019. 

Film review aggregator Rotten Tomatoes reports a 91% approval critic response based on 11 reviews, indicating "Fresh" and an average score of 8.0/10.

References

External links 
 

1976 films
Gay-related films
Films directed by Serge Gainsbourg
Films produced by Claude Berri
French LGBT-related films
Male bisexuality in film
Films scored by Serge Gainsbourg
1970s French films